Kang Ryang-uk (7 December 1903  – 9 January 1983), also spelled Kang Lyanguk, was a North Korean Presbyterian minister and Chairman of the Korean Christian Federation since 1946.

Kang was the maternal uncle of North Korean leader Kim Il-sung. Kim's mother, Kang's cousin, was Kang Pan-sok, who was also a devout Presbyterian. In his early years, Kang he was a school teacher (one of his pupils was Kim Il-sung). In the 1940s he studied Theology at the Pyongyang University, and after he completed his study he became a minister.

Kang became one of the close advisers of Kim Il-sung shortly after his return from the Soviet Union in October 1945. In 1946 he became the Chairman of the Christian League, later called the Korean Christian Federation. This organisation was in close contact with the Communist Party. In 1949 all Protestant Ministers were forced to join Kang's Christian Federation.

In the late 1940s, Kang became Vice Chairman of the Korean Social Democratic Party, which was a close ally of the ruling Workers' Party of Korea.

He became the Chairman of the party in November 1958.

Kang later served as a Vice President of North Korea and a secretary of the Supreme People's Assembly. He was appointed as Vice President by the Supreme People's Assembly in 1972 and he left the office in 1982. 

Kang's second son, Kang Yong-sop, later succeeded him as head of the Korean Christian Federation.

References

Further reading
  

North Korean Presbyterians
Government ministers of North Korea
Vice presidents of North Korea
Korean Social Democratic Party politicians
1902 births
People from Pyongyang
1983 deaths
Members of the 1st Supreme People's Assembly
Members of the 2nd Supreme People's Assembly
Members of the 3rd Supreme People's Assembly
Members of the 4th Supreme People's Assembly
Presbyterian ministers